Gustav "Gustl" Müller (23 October 1903 – 20 September 1989) was a German Nordic combined and cross-country skier.

Müller was born in Bayrischzell. At the age of 24 years, he participated at Nordic combined of the 1928 Winter Olympics, where he placed 21st in the final ranking. He also participated at the FIS Nordic World Ski Championships 1933, and was member of the Bronze teams at the first and second edition of the legendary Trofeo Mezzalama race, in 1933 together with Willy Bogner and Matthias Wörndle, and in 1934 together with Franz Fischer and Matthias Wörndle.

Further notable results:
 1927:
 1st, German Nordic combined championships, individual
 1st, German cross-country skiing championships, relay, together with Viktor Schneider, Ernst Huber, Hans Bauer and Hans Theato
 1929: 1st, German Nordic combined championships, individual
 1930:
 1st, German cross-country skiing championships, 50 km
 1st, German cross-country skiing championships, relay, together with Willi Leiner, Ernst Krebs, Georg Hagn and Martin Neuner
 1931:
 1st, German Nordic combined championships, individual
 1st, German cross-country skiing championships, relay, together with Willy Bogner, Ernst Krebs, Georg Hagn and Josef Ponn
 1932: 1st, German cross-country skiing championships, relay, together with Willy Bogner, Ernst Krebs, Walter Motz and Hans Darchinger

External links 
 
 Photo of Bogner and Müller

References 

1903 births
1989 deaths
German male Nordic combined skiers
German male cross-country skiers
German male ski mountaineers
Olympic Nordic combined skiers of Germany
Nordic combined skiers at the 1928 Winter Olympics
People from Miesbach (district)
Sportspeople from Upper Bavaria
20th-century German people